Keppler is a name of German origin. An alternative spelling is Kaeppler, and a closely related name is Kepler. The surname Keppler may refer to:

Adrienne L. Kaeppler (1935-2022), American anthropologist
Bernhard Keppler (born 1956), German chemist
Ernest Keppler (1918–2001), American politician and judge
Georg Keppler (1894–1966), German military leader
Herbert Keppler (1925–2008), American photographer
Joseph Keppler (1838–1894), American cartoonist
Reinhardt J. Keppler (1918–1942), American sailor
Rudolph Keppler (1845–1923), German-American banker and president of the New York Stock Exchange
Stephan Keppler (born 1983), German skier
Udo Keppler (Joseph Keppler Jr.) (1872–1956), American cartoonist
Victor Keppler (1904–1987), American photographer
Wilhelm Keppler (1882–1960), German businessman

Other uses
Michael Keppler, fictional character on the television series CSI
USS Keppler, several United States Navy ships

See also
Johannes Kepler (1571–1630), German astronomer and mathematician
Kepler (disambiguation)
Keppel (disambiguation)

German-language surnames